The Play and Rebuild Together Tournament was a charity international football tournament contested by the men's national veterans' teams. It took place in Albania on 10 January 2020 and the profits gathered from these meetings went to those affected by 2019 Albania earthquake.

Squads
The four men's national veterans' teams involved in the tournament were required to register a squad of over 11 players, including one or two goalkeepers.

Albania (veterans)

Coach:  Ilir Shulku
References:

Greece (veterans)

Coach:  Charalampos Zelenitsas
Reference:

Italy (veterans)

Coach:  Gianni De Biasi
References:

Turkey (veterans)

Coach:  Rüştü Reçber
Reference:

Results

Goalscorers

References

2020 in association football
2019–20 in Albanian football
2019–20 in Greek football
2019–20 in Italian football
2019–20 in Turkish football
January 2020 sports events in Europe
2020